Skitzo is a thrash metal band from Santa Rosa, California, United States. The band was formed in 1981 in Healdsburg, California, when Lance Ozanix and several other people joined together and called their band Venom. The name was later changed to Skitzo, after discovering that there is already a band with the same name.

The band's lead singer and songwriter, Lance Ozanix, vomits at the end of the band's performances so that the band can remain "recognizable". Ozanix can regurgitate his food and propel it 19 feet.

Ozanix appeared in an episode of Judge Judy when a woman, Sadie Luke, sued him for vomiting on her dress while Skitzo was performing at a club. Judge Judy believed that the vomiting was assault, because she was unaware that it was part of the act. Ozanix lost the case and had to pay $500 for damages as ruled by Judy.

Skitzo had performed at the Phoenix Theater in Petaluma, California, for their 30th anniversary on October 8, 2011.

In 2016 they celebrated their 35th anniversary.

Studio albums

Skitzo Demo, 1985
Wrathrage Demo, 1986
Mosh Till Mush Demo, 1987
Derageous EP, 1989
Haunting Ballads Single, 1990
The Skulling EP, 1991
Evilution Full-length, 1992
Synusar'sukus Full-length, 1994
Psychobabble Full-length, 1996
Got Sick! Full-length, 2000
M-80's Best of/Compilation, 2001
Hellavator Musick Full-length, 2002
Heavy Shit Full-length, 2005
Radio Promo Demo, 2007
Five Point Containment Full-length, 2007
Mosh till Vomit Best of/Compilation, 2008
Skitzo / Foul Stench Split, 2009
Put Your Face in Jesus EP
Spit Pea Soup EP
''Dementia Praecox - 2015

References

External links
 

Thrash metal musical groups from California
Musical groups established in 1981
Culture of Santa Rosa, California
Death metal musical groups from California